Luther Jewett (December 24, 1772March 8, 1860) was an American doctor, minister and politician. He served as a United States representative from Vermont.

Biography
Jewett was born in Canterbury in the Connecticut Colony to Daniel and Zilpha (Hibbard) Jewett. He graduated from Dartmouth College, A.B., in 1795. He studied medicine and began to practice in Putney, Vermont, in 1800. In 1810, Jewett received his M.B. from Dartmouth.

In 1814, Jewett was elected as a Federalist to the Fourteenth Congress and served from March 4, 1815, to March 3, 1817. After leaving Congress, Jewett moved to St. Johnsbury and studied theology. He was ordained as a pastor of the Congregation Church and Society and officiated in Newbury from 1821 to 1828. Jewett returned to St. Johnsbury and published the Farmer’s Herald from 1828 to 1832, and the Free Mason’s Friend from 1830 to 1832.

Family life
Jewett's first wife was Betsey Adams Jewett and their only child, Mira Jane Jewett Abbott, was born in 1809. Jewett's second wife was Nancy Chamberlain Jewett, and their daughter, Martha Jewett Lefevre, was born in 1817.

Death
Jewett died on March 8, 1860, in St. Johnsbury, Vermont, and is buried at Mount Pleasant Cemetery in Saint Johnsbury, along with both of his wives.

References

External links

 
 govtrack.us
 The Political Graveyard

1772 births
1860 deaths
People from Canterbury, Connecticut
Vermont state court judges
Dartmouth College alumni
Federalist Party members of the United States House of Representatives from Vermont
Burials in Vermont